The Copa Príncipe de Asturias ACB (ACB Prince of Asturias Cup) was a basketball tournament played with teams of Liga ACB between 1986 and 1991. The 1985 tournament was called Copa Asociación (Association Cup) or Torneo de la ACB (ACB Tournament). Since the next season to its end, it was called Copa Príncipe de Asturias.

Finals

History of the Cup

1985 edition
The first edition of Copa Príncipe de Asturias was played by the eliminated teams in the Round of 16 and the quarterfinals of the 1984–85 ACB season. Caja de Álava won the tournament, which was its first official title in the club history. The final was played in Villanueva de la Serena.

The first round was played between teams eliminated in Round of 16. The quarterfinalists of Liga ACB joined in the second round. A team would be eliminated if it losses two rounds. If the number of teams in a round was an odd number, a team would receive a bye to the next round.

First round

Second round

Third round

Fourth round

Semifinals and final

1986 edition
This was the first edition with the name of Copa Príncipe de Asturias. Like in the previous season, the tournament was played by the losers in the two first rounds of the 1985–86 ACB season. Teams were divided in two groups of four teams with a double round-robin competition. The two first qualifieds played the semifinals.

Finally, CB Estudiantes achieved the title.

1987 edition
The 1986–87 edition was played between the months of October and November 1986. A single round tournament was played. The final was in a neutral venue. In the first time they played the tournament, Joventut Badalona took the victory after defeating Manresa and playing only the semifinal game at home.

1988 edition
Like in the last year, the 1987–88 Copa Príncipe was played with a knockout stage format, but in double leg series. The Final Four was played in single games at Palma de Mallorca. FC Barcelona won its first tournament.

1989 edition
This edition was played between the three first qualified teams of Group A1 and the leader of Group A2 in the 1987–88 ACB season. The Cup was held at Ferrol in a Final Four format in September 1989.

1990 edition
The edition of the 1989–90 season was suspended due to a strike called by the players.

1991 edition
The format was similar than the 1989 edition and it was held at A Coruña in September 1991. This was the last edition of the Copa Príncipe de Asturias with teams of Liga ACB and Joventut Badalona won its third title.

References

External links
 History of Copa Príncipe in FEB.es (Spanish)
 ACB official website

Basketball cup competitions in Spain